The Peugeot 408 is an automobile nameplate used by the French automobile manufacturer for two different car models:

 Peugeot 408 (saloon), a C-segment saloon car mainly marketed in China, Southeast Asia and Latin America since 2010 across three generations
 Peugeot 408 (crossover), a C-segment crossover introduced in 2022 marketed in Europe and in China as the 408 X

408
Cars introduced in 2010